Shodapur is a village in Panipat district of the Haryana state in India. 
The Second Battle of Panipat was fought on 5 November 1556 between the forces of Akbar and Hemu, a Hindu king of Delhi. In the battle, a wounded Hemu was captured by Shah Quli Khan and carried to the Mughal camp at Shodapur on Jind Road at Panipat where he was beheaded.

After a few years, Hemu's supporters, constructed a Samadhi (Hindu shrine) over the place where he was beheaded. The place and its surroundings have been slowly encroached upon by the local Muslim people who have converted it into a Muslim durgah. This is the only memorial of Hemu in Panipat but it is in a bad condition.

Gallery

See also

Kabuli Bagh Mosque
Ibrahim Lodhi's Tomb
Panipat Places Of Interest

References

Villages in Panipat district